Stephen Richard Bielby (born 9 March 1947 in Windsor) is an English former first-class cricketer active 1964–73 who played for Nottinghamshire.

References

External links

1947 births
English cricketers
Nottinghamshire cricketers
Buckinghamshire cricketers
Living people
Sportspeople from Windsor, Berkshire
20th-century English people